Wayne Ferreira was the defending champion but lost in the quarterfinals to Tim Henman.

David Prinosil won in the final 6–1, 6–2 against Petr Korda.

Seeds
A champion seed is indicated in bold text while text in italics indicates the round in which that seed was eliminated.

  Goran Ivanišević (second round)
  Wayne Ferreira (quarterfinals)
  Boris Becker (second round, withdrew)
  Richard Krajicek (first round)
  Todd Martin (quarterfinals)
  Michael Stich (quarterfinals)
  Tim Henman (semifinals)
  Bohdan Ulihrach (second round)

Draw

References
 1996 IPB Czech Indoor Draw

1996 Singles
Czech Indoor,Singles